The Snare is a 1912 silent film short directed by Theodore Wharton and starring Beverly Bayne, William Bailey and Lily Branscombe. It was produced by Essanay Studios and distributed through General Film Company.

Cast
William Bailey - Tom Ransom
Lily Branscombe - Mrs. Ransom, Tom's Mother
Beverly Bayne - Mary Clement, Detective
Frank Dayton - Police Chief
E. H. Calvert - Detective
Charles Hitchcock - Detective
Billy Mason - Detective (*William Mason)
Howard Missimer - Telegraph Operator
Whitney Raymond - Boy in Detective Office

References

External links
The Snare at IMDb.com

1912 short films
1912 films
Essanay Studios films
Films directed by Theodore Wharton
Silent American drama films
1912 drama films
American black-and-white films
American silent short films
1910s American films
1910s English-language films